Matane-Matapédia is a provincial electoral district in the Bas-Saint-Laurent region of Quebec, Canada, that elects members to the National Assembly of Quebec. It includes the municipalities of Matane, Mont-Joli, Amqui, Sainte-Luce, Causapscal, Price, Sayabec, Saint-Ulric, Lac-au-Saumon and Saint-Gabriel-de-Rimouski.

It was created for the 2012 election from part of the former Matane and all of the former Matapédia electoral districts.

Members of the National Assembly

Election results

References

External links
Information
 Elections Quebec

Maps
 2011 map (PDF)
2001–2011 changes to Matane (Flash)
2001–2011 changes to Matapédia (Flash)
 Electoral map of Bas-Saint-Laurent region
 Quebec electoral map, 2011

Matane
Quebec provincial electoral districts